The Daffodil Mystery is a 1920 thriller novel by the British writer Edgar Wallace. It features the detective Jack Tarling and his Chinese assistant Ling Chu.

Adaptation
It was adapted into a West German film The Devil's Daffodil (1961), part of a long-running series of Wallace adaptations made by Rialto Film.

References

Bibliography
 Clark, Neil. Stranger than Fiction: The Life of Edgar Wallace, the Man Who Created King Kong. Stroud, UK: The History Press, 2015.
 Goble, Alan. The Complete Index to Literary Sources in Film. Walter de Gruyter, 1999.

1920 British novels
Novels by Edgar Wallace
British thriller novels
British novels adapted into films